The Little Rascals' Christmas Special is an animated Christmas television special based on the Our Gang comedies of the 1920s-40s. The special was produced by King World Productions, and first aired December 3, 1979 on NBC. It is a spoof of the 1905 O. Henry short story The Gift of the Magi.

Plot 
Spanky (Philip Tanzini) and Porky (Robby Kiger)'s mother (Darla Hood) is a single mother during the Depression. Money is tight with very little left over to buy anything nice. When the boys overhear Mom talking on the phone about a blue comet, they think she is ordering for them a Blue Comet train set for the holidays. However, Mom was talking about the train, but rather a vacuum cleaner. Realizing that she confused her sons, she exchanges a coat she had ordered for the train. When she gets sick and the boys realize the truth, they enlist the help of the gang to raise the money to get the coat back. Meanwhile, two neighborhood bullies steal the train set so now there are no gifts for the boys or their mom. A grouchy Salvation Army Santa (Jack Somack) arrives to spread cheer.

Cast 
 Philip Tanzini – Spanky
 Jimmy Gatherum – Alfalfa
 Randi Kiger – Darla
 Al Jocko Fann – Stymie
 Robby Kiger – Porky
 Jack Somack – Santa
 Darla Hood – Mom
 Stymie Beard – Mr. Klugger (The Butcher)
 Cliff Norton – Angry Man
 Frank Nelson – Sales Clerk
 Melville A. Levin – Delivery Man
 Hal Smith – Uncle Hominy (Alfalfa's Uncle)
 Naomi Lewis – Sales Lady
 Ike Eisenmann – Bully

Notes
 While initially airing on NBC, the special later went into television syndication, most recently airing in December 2009, on ABC Family, which later became Freeform.
 The Little Rascals mention that their club, the Reindeer Club, was originally the Woodchucks Club. This is a nod to the Our Gang short Anniversary Trouble.
 Two of the original Our Gang cast members, Darla Hood and Matthew "Stymie" Beard, provide voices. Hood portrays the mother of Spanky and Porky, while Beard plays the neighborhood butcher.
 Darla Hood's final role. She died nearly six months before this special aired.
 Following the release of this special, the animated cels were reused for 156 thirty second Public Service Announcements, featuring the Little Rascals. The principal voice actors reprised their roles for these commercials.

References

External links 
 The Little Rascals Christmas Special - Youtube

External links
 

1979 television specials
1970s American television specials
1970s animated television specials
NBC television specials
Christmas television specials
Our Gang films
Television shows written by Romeo Muller
American Christmas television specials
Animated Christmas television specials
Works set during the Great Depression